Caíque Silvio Souza da Silva (born 13 January 1999) is a Brazilian professional footballer who plays as an attacking midfielder for Vitória.

References

External links

1999 births
Living people
Brazilian footballers
Association football midfielders
Esporte Clube Vitória players
Campeonato Brasileiro Série B players